Travis Mulraine (born 2 May 1977) is a Trinidad and Tobago football coach and former player.

Early and personal life
Born in Laventille, Mulraine attended Queen's Royal College.

Club career
Mulraine played as a midfielder for Joe Public, San Jose Earthquakes, D.C. United, W Connection, San Juan Jabloteh, Caledonia AIA and Fredericksburg Hotspur.

In 2000 he was drafted by the San Jose Earthquakes in the first round of the 2000 Major League Soccer SuperDraft as the 8th overall pick. After being released by San Jose Earthquakes on 13 March 2001 he signed for D.C. United the next day. He was waived 14 days later in a pre-season roster reduction.

In November 2001 he underwent a 5-day trial wirh German club Union Berlin. He initially retired from football after the 2008 season, before returning to former club San Juan Jabloteh in July 2009, taking up a role as a player-coach, before becoming player-coach at Caledonia AIA in February 2010. In 2012 he became a player-coach at Fredericksburg Hotspur.

International career
He earned 22 caps for the Trinidad and Tobago national team between 1995 and 2005. In November 2002 he became captain of the national team.

Coaching career
In May 2009 he began training as a coach. He began as a player-coach at San Juan Jabloteh later that year, becoming player-coach at Caledonia AIA in February 2010. In 2012 he became a player-coach at Fredericksburg Hotspur. He later managed Matura Reunited, resigning in September 2018.

References

1977 births
Living people
Trinidad and Tobago footballers
Trinidad and Tobago international footballers
Joe Public F.C. players
San Jose Earthquakes players
San Jose Earthquakes draft picks
D.C. United players
W Connection F.C. players
San Juan Jabloteh F.C. players
Morvant Caledonia United players
Fredericksburg Hotspur players
TT Pro League players
Major League Soccer players
USL League Two players
Association football midfielders
Trinidad and Tobago expatriate footballers
Trinidad and Tobago expatriates in the United States
Expatriate soccer players in the United States
Trinidad and Tobago football managers
Alumni of Queen's Royal College, Trinidad